Little Grass Valley Reservoir is an artificial lake in Plumas County, California and Plumas National Forest near the Pacific Crest Trail.

The lake's waters are impounded by Little Grass Valley Dam (National ID CA00269), which was completed in 1961.

Hydrology
The lake discharges into the South Fork Feather River.

Little Grass Valley Dam

The South Feather Water and Power Agency owns the dam.

Recreation
Located in Plumas National Forest near the Pacific Crest Trail, Little Grass Valley Reservoir is the centerpiece of the Little Grass Valley Recreation Area, managed by the Feather River Ranger District.  The area supports boating, camping, fishing, swimming, picnicking, horseback riding, mountain biking, wildlife viewing, and hiking.

Access
By car, the lake is about ninety minutes from Yuba City.  The Pacific Crest Trail passes north of the lake and can be reached by way of the Bald Mountain Trail from Horse Camp.

See also
 List of dams and reservoirs in California
 List of lakes in California
 Grass valley
 Grass Valley, California

References

Reservoirs in Plumas County, California
Reservoirs in California
Reservoirs in Northern California
Artificial lakes of the United States